The Varukers are a British punk rock band formed in 1979 by vocalist Anthony "Rat" Martin. They produced their most influential recordings in the early 1980s. The band play in D-beat, the musical style of Discharge. Also like Discharge, the Varukers' lyrics carry an anarchist political ideology.

History
Initially known as the Veruccas, the band altered the spelling of their name to the Varukers to convey more aggression. When recording in the early 1980s, they were part of a broader trend known as "UK 82", second generation punk, or UK hardcore. Bands such as the Varukers, Discharge, Chaos UK, Amebix, the Exploited, and Charged GBH took the existing 1977-era punk sound and melded it with the incessant, heavy drumbeats and "wall of sound" distortion guitar sound of new wave of British heavy metal (NWOBHM) bands such as Motörhead. The new, harder-edged style also tended to use much darker, more nihilistic, and more violent lyrics, and vocals were often shouted rather than sung.

While the Varukers split in 1989, vocalist Rat and guitarist Biff put the band back together in 1991. Stylistically their 1990s-era music resembled the traditional UK82 style. Since the band had former members of Discharge, a D-beat sound developed as time went on. The band has gone through many line-up changes over the years with the only constant member being Rat on vocals while guitarist Biff has been with the band since 1985. They have recently released a retrospective CD on SOS Records.

Even with Rat splitting his time between the Varukers and Discharge and Biff splitting his time with Sick on the Bus. The Varukers continue to tour. They shared a headlining spot with such acts as Broken Bones, The Adicts, Vice Squad and GBH at the ill-fated British Invasion 2k6 concert festival in San Bernardino, California, which ended in rioting.

Guitarist Sean is the former manager of the public house The Olde Angel in Nottingham, United Kingdom.

Journalist and Killing Joke biographer Jyrki "Spider" Hämäläinen is currently working on a documentary about the band.

Members
Anthony "Rat" Martin - vocals
Ian "Biff" Smith - guitar
Brian Ansell - bass
Kevin Frost - drums

Discography 
Chart placings from the UK Independent Chart.
 Protest and Survive EP (1981) - no. 31
 I Don't Wanna Be a Victim EP (1982) - no. 15
 "Die for Your Government" single (1982) - no. 5
 Bloodsuckers LP (1983) - no. 8
 Led to the Slaughter EP (1984) - no. 24
 Another Religion, Another War EP (1984) - no. 47
 Massacred Millions EP (1984) - no. 30
 One Struggle, One Fight LP (1984)
 Prepare for the Attack LP (1986)
 Nothing Changed EP (1994)
 Deadly Games LP/CD (compilation) (1994)
 Murder LP/CD (1998)
 How Do You Sleep? (2000)
 Hellbound LP/CD (2005)
 1980–2005: Collection Of 25 Years CD (2006) re-recorded tracks
 Killing Myself to Live CD (2009)
 Damned and Defiant LP/CD (2017)
Compilations
 Still Bollox but Still Here (re-release of old tracks) CD (1995)
 Riot City Years: '83-'84 CD (2004) Punk Core Records
 Punk Singles 1981–1985 CD (2005)
 Murder/Nothing Changed LP (Reissued 2010) Rodent Popsicle Records

References

External links 
 
 [ The Varukers on allmusic.com]
 The Varukers on Myspace
 Interview with Marvin

British crust and d-beat groups